Las Mañanitas is an annual event held in Ponce, Puerto Rico, dedicated to Our Lady of Guadalupe. It consists of a pre-dawn popular parade, followed by a Catholic Mass, and a popular town breakfast hosted by the municipal government. It takes place on December 12, and is a traditional event sponsored by the Roman Catholic Diocese of Ponce but attended by Catholic leaders from Puerto Rico at large. Widely covered by the press every year, the event is attended by over 10,000 people, including religious and political leaders and the general public. Due to the coronavirus pandemic, the 2020 celebration will take place in a modified program fashion: there will be no walked procession, as traditionally done, but instead the Eucharist will be televised and would-be attendees can instead celebrate Las Mañanitas from their own homes.

History
The celebration started in 1964, but the circumstances of its origin are uncertain. Some say it was started by immigrant Mexican engineers while others state it was started by Spaniards from Extremadura, Spain. During the celebration participants and attendees join in singing together the traditional Las Mañanitas song while Mexican mariachis provide the background music. The city of Ponce offers a free breakfast to everyone present at the historic Ponce City Hall after the religious Mass concludes.

Venue
The outdoors/indoors pre-dawn festival-parade starts at Parque del Tricentenario, runs down Calle Isabel and ends at Catedral de Nuestra Señora de Guadalupe at Plaza Las Delicias in downtown Ponce.

Attendance and cost
The early morning, pre-dawn celebration is attended by over 10,000 people, including mayors and other prominent figures. In 2016, the event, together with the lighting of the City Hall Christmas decorations and the kickoff of its fiestas patronales, cost the municipality around $30,000.

Schedule
The celebration occurs every December 12 and starts at 4:00am. The city of Ponce offers a free breakfast to everyone present at the historic Ponce City Hall after the religious Mass concludes. Mariachis continue their music while attendees have their breakfast.

While not a part of this celebration, in the past the Government of Ponce has scheduled the Ponce Marathon to occur on the same day as the Las Mañanitas celebration. Marathon runners get an early start (5am) and complete their run just after the Catholic Mass has ended and while the public municipal city breakfast is taking place.

See also
 Feria de Artesanías de Ponce
 Ponce Jazz Festival
 Fiesta Nacional de la Danza
 Día Mundial de Ponce
 Festival Nacional de la Quenepa
 Bienal de Arte de Ponce
 Festival de Bomba y Plena de San Antón
 Festival Nacional Afrocaribeño
 Carnaval de Ponce
 Carnaval de Vejigantes

References

External links 

Events in Puerto Rico
Food and drink festivals in Puerto Rico
Annual events in Puerto Rico
Events in Ponce, Puerto Rico
Religious festivals in Puerto Rico
Parades in Puerto Rico
Folk festivals in Puerto Rico